Elmer Ellsworth Ferry (August 2, 1861 – May 30, 1932) was an American farmer and politician from New York.

Life 
Ferry was born on August 2, 1861 in Almond, New York.

Ferry attended the district schools and spent a year in Alfred University. He took over the family farm when his father was discouraged by the poor results from the farming. He used modern methods and new business strategies to turn the farm deep in debt into a successful dairy of Holstein cattle.

In 1913, Ferry was elected to the New York State Assembly as a Republican, representing Allegany County. He served in the Assembly in 1914 and 1915.

Ferry was a member of the Freemasons, the Royal Arch Masonry, the Knights Templar, the Shriners, the Almond board of education, and the Almond Grange. He was treasurer of the Woodlawn Cemetery Association. He was a member of the Presbyterian Church as well as its deacon. He was also a founder of the Almond Library, donating a number of books for it. He was married to Florence Collins of Arkport. Their children were Claude, Elsie Grace, Helen Marr, Mildred, and Hiram.

Ferry died in Bethesda Hospital in Hornell from pneumonia that set in after an operation on May 30, 1932. He was buried in Woodlawn Cemetery in Almond.

References

External links 

 The Political Graveyard

1861 births
1932 deaths
People from Allegany County, New York
Alfred University alumni
Farmers from New York (state)
20th-century American politicians
Republican Party members of the New York State Assembly
American Freemasons
Presbyterians from New York (state)
School board members in New York (state)
Deaths from pneumonia in New York (state)
Burials in New York (state)